The Turbo-Union RB199 is a turbofan jet engine designed and built in the early 1970s by Turbo-Union, a joint venture between Rolls-Royce, MTU and Aeritalia. The only production application was the Panavia Tornado.

Design and development

The RB199 originated with a requirement, in 1969, to power a new European multirole combat aircraft(MRCA) called the Panavia MRCA. The engine requirements to meet the Panavia MRCA specification were significant advances over current engines in thrust-to-weight ratio, fuel consumption and size. The final selection of the engine for the MRCA was made between a new European collaboration, Turbo Union, with the RB199, and Pratt & Whitney who proposed the JTF16. The Panavia MRCA would later be called the Panavia Tornado.

Advanced engine studies at Bristol Siddeley had already been done to support the BAC/Dassault AFVG and were based on the Pegasus two-spool arrangement. At Rolls-Royce, where the three spool RB211 engine was in development, 3 shafts were considered better. Rolls-Royce took over Bristol Siddeley in 1967 so the configuration for the RB199 was decided jointly, a three shaft engine.

The overall design concept for the international collaborative program, 3 shafts and a bypass ratio (BPR) of about 1.2, was decided by Rolls-Royce. The bypass ratio was chosen for long-range, low fuel consumption particularly when throttled back. The selected BPR also gave a higher reheat boost than with smaller values used on similar engines such as 0.4. The design of the individual modules was shared between Rolls-Royce, MTU and Fiat according to their existing expertise. For example, Rolls-Royce designed the fan using scaled-down Pegasus knowledge. They also did the combustor, high pressure (HP) turbine and reheat. The reheat used cold air combustion techniques, described by Sotheran and which were derived from their experience with ramjets and plenum chamber burning (PCB) in Pegasus front nozzles. Fiat had built turbines for the Viper so did the low pressure(LP) turbine as well as the final nozzle. MTU did the intermediate pressure(IP) and high pressure (HP) compressor, IP turbine and thrust reverser.

A three-spool arrangement reduces the pressure ratio on each compressor so no variable stators were needed. To meet the short afterburner requirement an arrangement known as mix-then-burn, as used in current engines, was not possible because it was too long and heavy. The RB199 used a much shorter arrangement known as mix/burn. 

The first test run of the RB199 was done on 27 September 1971 at Patchway, UK.  It was flight-tested using an Avro Vulcan with the engine installed in a nacelle that was representative of the Tornado aircraft. The Vulcan first flew with the RB199 in 1972.

Service flying with the Royal Air Force, German Navy and German and Italian Air Forces in the European environment showed normal failure mechanisms for turbine blades, thermal fatigue, creep and high cycle fatigue (HCF) so development started on replacing the initial production equiaxed blades with single-crystal ones which last longer at high temperatures.

Sand ingestion tests had been done and passed as part of the qualification for service introduction but operating in desert conditions with the Royal Saudi Air Force produced new problems. Frequent flying in air carrying different sizes of sand particles caused deposits on the HP turbine blades from sand passing through the combustor. In addition, sand carried with the cooling air through the blades blocked the cooling holes. Single crystal blades were being introduced to improve the life of the blades for the European operating conditions and revised cooling hole arrangements were introduced at the same time to reduce the detrimental effect of sand on blade cooling. With incorporation of these blade processing and cooling changes "Desert Storm Tornado aircraft flew some of the most arduous missions of any Allied aircraft with reliability no worse than peacetime and no engines were rejected for HP Turbine blade defects."
   
Looking back on the RB199 program in 2002 Chief Engineer for the RB199, Dr.Gordon Lewis, concluded "The final production standard provided satisfactory reliability and performance."

Variants and applications
RB199 Mk 101
Initial variant powered first Tornado IDS deliveries, with a 38.7kN (8700lbf) dry thrust, 66.01kN (14840lbf) with afterburner.
RB199 Mk 103
Powering Tornado IDS strike versions, with a thrust rating of 40.5 kN (dry) 71.2 kN (reheat)
RB199 Mk 104
Powering the Tornado F3 Air Defence Variant, with a thrust rating of 40.5 kN (dry) 73 kN (reheat)
RB 199 Mk104D
Derivative used on the BAe EAP.
RB199 Mk 105
Powering Tornado ECR versions and applicable to IDS, with a thrust rating of 42.5 kN (dry) 74.3 kN (reheat)
RB199-122
A derivative of the Mk104 (originally designated Mk 104E), powering the first two prototypes of the Eurofighter Typhoon (DA1 and DA2) until the initial versions of the Eurojet EJ200 were available.

Engines on display
A Turbo-Union RB199 is on public display at the Royal Air Force Museum Cosford and Brooklands Museum Weybridge.

A Turbo-Union RB199 is on public display at the Morayvia Centre in Kinloss.

A Turbo-Union RB199 is on public display at the Montrose Air Station Heritage Centre

Specifications (RB199-104)

See also

References
Notes

Bibliography

External links

Rolls-Royce.com - RB199

Low-bypass turbofan engines
1970s turbofan engines
Three-spool turbofan engines